Indian Airlines Flight 814, commonly known as IC 814, was an Indian Airlines Airbus A300 en route from Tribhuvan International Airport in Kathmandu, Nepal, to Indira Gandhi International Airport in Delhi, India, on Friday, 24 December 1999, when it was hijacked and flown to several locations before landing in Kandahar, Afghanistan.

The aircraft was piloted by 37-year-old Captain Devi Sharan and first officer Rajinder Kumar, with 58-year-old flight engineer Anil Kumar Jaggia. The Airbus was hijacked by five masked Pakistani militants of the Harkat-ul-Mujahideen (HuM) shortly after it entered Indian airspace at about 17:30 IST. The hijackers ordered the aircraft to be flown to a series of locations: Amritsar, Lahore, and across the Persian Gulf to Dubai. The hijackers finally forced the aircraft to land in Kandahar, Afghanistan, which at the time was controlled by the Taliban. The hijackers released 27 of 176 passengers in Dubai but fatally stabbed one and wounded several others.

At that time, most of Afghanistan, including the Kandahar airport where the hijacked plane landed, was under Taliban control. Taliban militiamen fighters encircled the aircraft to prevent any Indian military intervention, which was found by current National Security Advisor Ajit Doval when he landed there. They also found two Inter-Services Intelligence (Pakistan) officers were on the apron and others soon joined them; one was a lieutenant colonel and the other a major. Doval said that if the hijackers did not have ISI support, India could have resolved the crisis.

The motive for the hijacking was to secure the release of Islamist terrorists held in prison in India – fellow HuM members Ahmed Omar Saeed Sheikh and Masood Azhar, and a Kashmiri militant, Mushtaq Ahmed Zargar. The hostage crisis lasted for seven days and ended after India agreed to release the three terrorists. The three have since been implicated in other terrorist actions, such as the 2001 Indian Parliament attack, 2002 kidnapping and murder of Daniel Pearl, 2008 Mumbai terror attacks, 2016 Pathankot attack and the 2019 Pulwama attack. 

The hijacking has been seen as one of the millennium attack plots in late December 1999 and early January 2000 by al-Qaeda-linked terrorists.

Background 
Harkat-ul-Mujahideen had already perpetrated several attacks and kidnappings in order to secure the release of their leaders imprisoned in India, including Masood Azhar who had been arrested in 1994. These included the 1994 kidnappings of Western tourists in India by Ahmed Omar Saeed Sheikh, who was captured during the act and was released with Azhar during this hijacking and went on to join the HuM splinter group Jaish-e-Mohammed founded by Azhar in 2000; 1995 kidnapping of Western tourists in Kashmir by Al-Faran (pesudonym of HuM) where most abductees were killed with one beheaded. Amjad Farooqi who was involved in the 1995 kidnapping was also one of the perpetrators of this hijacking under the alias "Mansur Hasnain".

In 1999, Sajjad Afghani, the founder of HuM who had been arrested with Azhar, was killed during a jailbreak which directly led to this hijacking and whose body was one of the hijackers initial demands.

Al-Qaeda and Osama bin Laden had provided organisational support for the kidnapping in order to have their associate Azhar released.

The identities of the five hijackers have been determined to be Ibrahim Akhtar (from Bahawalpur), Shahid Akhtar Sayeed, Sunny Ahmed Qazi, Zahoor Mistry (all three from Karachi) and Shakir (from Sukkur). They had arrived in Nepal, HuM's contact-hub for attacks in India, and boarded the plane from Kathmandu Airport.

Hijacking

On 24 December 1999, Indian Airlines flight IC 814 took off from Kathmandu, Nepal, with Delhi, India as its intended destination. The flight left with 180 persons on board, including both the crew and the passengers. One of the passengers on board was Roberto Giori, the then-owner of De La Rue Giori, a company which controlled the majority of the world's currency-printing business at the time.

Shortly after the flight left Kathmandu, senior steward Anil Sharma was accosted by a man wearing a ski mask, who told him that the plane was being hijacked and that he was carrying a bomb. The hijackers instructed Captain Devi Sharan to, "fly west", and accordingly the flight entered Pakistani air space, but was refused permission to land in Lahore, Pakistan, by Pakistani Air Traffic Control. On being told that there was insufficient fuel to go further, the hijackers allowed Captain Sharan to land the flight in Amritsar, Punjab, to refuel.

Subsequent intelligence reports indicated that the hijackers had purchased five tickets on the flight in Kathmandu; two first class tickets were bought directly, while three economy seats were bought through a travel agency. Indian intelligence officials believed that Dawood Ibrahim, an Indian gangster/globally wanted terrorist (hiding in Islamabad, Pakistan), had provided assistance in giving the hijackers access to the airport in Kathmandu.

Passenger accounts later stated that the hijackers ordered the crew to take away the lunch that had been served, and separated the men from the women and children, blindfolding them and threatening them with explosives if they did not co-operate.

Landing in Amritsar, India
Air Traffic Control (ATC) in India first received news of the hijacking at 4:40 pm. The Crisis Management Group of the Indian Government, led by Union Secretary Prabhat Kumar, did not convene on receiving the news that the plane had been hijacked, and information concerning the hijacking was not communicated at that time to the Intelligence Bureau or the Research and Analysis Wing. The Prime Minister of India, Atal Bihari Vajpayee, was briefed regarding the incident at 7:00 pm.

At 6:04 pm the Indian ATC made contact with flight IC 814, but had not received any orders on how to proceed. Captain Devi Sharan notified ATC that they were running low on fuel and had not been allowed to land in Lahore by Pakistani ATC. Sharan continued to make contact with ATC, requesting them to reach out to Pakistan and obtain permission to land, as the hijackers did not want to land in India and had already threatened to execute 10 hostages if their demands were not met. At 6:30 pm, the Indian High Commission in Pakistan requested permission for the plane to land there, but was denied.

At 6:44 pm, flight IC 814 began descent over the nearest airport in Amritsar, following a message from Captain Sharan, and was approached by local officials. The Director-General of Police for the state of Punjab, Sarabjeet Singh, later stated that he only received information regarding the hijacking when he saw it on television at 6 pm that evening. The Union Government's Home Minister, L.K. Advani, also stated later that he was informed about the incident via the news, and not by the Crisis Management Group, which had convened since then. Although he had recently stepped down as Inspector-General of Police in the area, J.P. Birdi met up with the plane, since his successor, Bakshi Ram, was on leave when the incident occurred.

On landing, IC 814 requested immediate refuelling for the aircraft. Captain Sharan later stated that he had hoped that with the assistance of Indian government, the hijacking would be prevented and that the plane would not have to take off again from Amritsar. In accordance with hijacking contingency plans prepared by the Crisis Management Group, a local committee consisting of the District Collector, the senior-most police and intelligence officials, and the airport manager had been created; they were instructed to delay the refuelling of the plane for as long as possible. These orders had been received by the committee from the Central Government at 6:40 pm, however, a phone call received with contradictory orders delayed initial response. This phone call was later established to have been an attempted hoax. A note sent to the local committee advised them to ensure the delay by any possible means, including deflating the aircraft tires if necessary.

Between landing and take-off again at 7:50 pm, Captain Sharan made contact with the ATC four times, informing them that the hijackers were armed with Kalashnikov rifles and had begun killing hostages, and requested them to refuel the plane as fast as possible to prevent any additional deaths. The hijackers had refused to communicate with local police officials while the plane was in Amritsar. Later accounts indicated that the hijackers, who were upset by the delay in refuelling, attacked Satnam Singh, a German citizen on board the plane, with a knife, causing him several wounds to the neck.

At 7:45 pm, local Punjab Police Commandos were placed on standby and ordered by the Crisis Management Group to accompany the fuel-reloading vehicles towards the plane, with the intention of deflating the plane tires in order to immobilize the plane. A fuel tanker was sent to block the aircraft's path but was ordered by the ATC to slow down as the driver was approaching the plane at a high speed. On receiving this order, the tanker came to an abrupt halt. Later, it was revealed that this approach caused the hijackers to suspect that the refuelling process would prevent their departure, and they ordered Captain Sharan to take off immediately, resulting in the plane narrowly avoiding hitting the fuel tanker on the runway. Five passengers had been placed in seats towards the front with their hands bound, and the hijackers threatened that these hostages would be executed if the plane did not take off immediately. The plane left Amritsar at 7:49 pm, and Captain Sharan announced the departure to the ATC, stating, "We are all dying." Commandos from the Indian special forces unit, the National Security Guard, arrived at the airport just as IC 814 departed.

Later, it was revealed that there were efforts by ex-RAW chief A. S. Dulat and others to cover up the real motives of why the plane was not immobilised and why there were no commando-operation to neutralise the threat. The RAW officer named Shashi Bhushan Singh Tomar, husband of Sonia Tomar, was boarded on the plane, who was a brother-in-law of N. K. Singh, secretary to then Prime Minister Atal Bihari Vajpayee and he ensured that the plane would be let off and no commando operation would be carried out to ensure his brother-in-law's safety. According to RAW officer, R. K. Yadav, author of Mission RAW, days before the hijacking, U. V. Singh, another RAW operative in Kathmandu informed Tomar that Pakistani terrorists were planning to hijack an Indian plane and he ordered Singh to check the veracity of his report where Singh vouched for its reliability but Tomar rebuked him and told him not to spread rumours. Later, Tomar was found on the same plane which was hijacked and became the cause of failure of the operation. The then Prime Minister Atal Bihari Vajpayee was kept in the dark until around 7:00 pm, a full hour and 40 minutes since the hijacking of IC 814 and he came to know about the hijacking only after disembarking from the aircraft in the VIP bay of Palam Technical Area.

Landing in Lahore, Pakistan
On approaching Lahore, Pakistan, Flight IC 814 requested permission to land and was denied by Pakistani ATC, which turned off all lights and navigational aids at the airport to prevent a landing. As the plane had not been refuelled in Amritsar, and was running out of fuel, Captain Sharan attempted to crash-land without navigational aids and lights, nearly landing on a highway. Following this, Pakistani ATC turned on navigational aids and allowed the plane to land in Lahore at 8:07 pm.

India had, on receiving the information that the plane had landed in Lahore in Pakistan, sought a helicopter to transport the Indian High Commissioner, G. Parthasarthy in Islamabad, Pakistan, to Lahore airport, and had requested Pakistani authorities to ensure that the plane did not leave Lahore. Pakistani forces turned off runway lights again to prevent the plane from departing after it had been refuelled, and surrounded the plane with special forces commandos. They also attempted to negotiate with the hijackers to release women and children aboard the flight, but were denied. The Indian High Commissioner, G. Parthasarthy, was provided with a helicopter but only arrived in Lahore after Flight IC 814 had been refuelled and allowed to leave. Indian Foreign Office officials reached out for confirmation of reports that passengers on board had been killed, but did not receive a response from Pakistani authorities regarding this.

Landing in Dubai, UAE
Upon departure from Lahore, the flight was prevented from landing in Oman; the hijackers instead settled for neighboring Dubai, UAE (about 1,250 miles distance from Lahore). After Dubai International Airport denied permission to land, permission was granted instead at Al Minhad Air Base. The hijackers released 27 passengers, including a critically injured 25-year-old male hostage, Rupin Katyal, who had been stabbed by the hijackers multiple times. Rupin had died before the aircraft landed in Al Minhad Air Base. Indian authorities wanted Indian commandos trained in hijack rescue to assault the aircraft but the UAE government refused permission.

Landing in Kandahar, Afghanistan
After the aircraft landed in Kandahar, Taliban authorities offered to mediate between India and the hijackers, which India believed initially. Since India did not recognise the Taliban regime, it dispatched an official from its High Commission in Islamabad to Kandahar. India's lack of previous contact with the Taliban regime complicated the negotiating process.

However, the intention of the Taliban was under doubt after its armed fighters surrounded the aircraft. The Taliban maintained that the forces were deployed in an attempt to dissuade the hijackers from killing or injuring the hostages but some analysts believe it was done to prevent an Indian military operation against the hijackers. IB chief Ajit Doval claimed that the hijackers were getting active ISI support in Kandahar and that the ISI had removed all the pressure the Indians were trying to put on the hijackers, meaning that their safe exit was guaranteed and they had no need to negotiate an escape route. Doval also mentioned that if the hijackers were not getting active ISI support in Kandahar then India could have resolved the hijacking.

While in Kandahar, the plane's engine remained continuously on to protect everyone from the bitterly cold winter nights of Afghanistan.

Negotiations
On December 25 and 26, India discussed their approach to negotiations internally, while passengers on board Flight IC 814 awaited a decision. Passengers later stated that they received irregular meals and had limited access to drinking water and sanitation facilities, and that the hijackers utilised the public announcement system on board the plane to proselytize to the passengers.

On December 25, Indian Airlines provided a special relief plane, which flew back 27 passengers who had been released, as well as the body of Rupin Katyal, who had been killed while the plane was in Dubai, and Satnam Singh, who had been attacked by the hijackers in Amritsar and had suffered knife wounds to the neck.

Home Minister L. K. Advani had opposed exchanging the hostages for release of the hijackers, as this would affect public opinion of the government, while External Affairs Minister Jaswant Singh advocated negotiation with the Taliban. On December 27, the Indian government sent a team of negotiators headed by Vivek Katju, Joint-Secretary in the Ministry of Home Affairs, along with Home Ministry official Ajit Doval and S.D. Sahay from the Cabinet Secretariat.

Negotiations did not progress, as Taliban officials initially refused to allow Indian special forces to attempt a covert operation, and declined to allow their own special forces to do so as well. To prevent any military action, Taliban officials surrounded the aircraft with tanks, and on December 27, a Taliban official speaking to a local newspaper stated that the hijackers should either leave Afghanistan or put down their weapons. Indian officials interpreted this statement as an understanding that Taliban officials would arrest the hijackers if they surrendered, and began to negotiate with them concerning their demands.
Maulana Masood Azhar – who founded Jaish-e-Muhammed in 2000, which gained notoriety for its alleged role in the 2001 Indian Parliament attack and 2008 Mumbai attacks, which led to death of hundreds of people, along with the 2019 Pulwama Attack which led to the death of 44 CRPF personnel.
Ahmed Omar Saeed Sheikh – who was arrested in 2002 by Pakistani authorities for the abduction and murder of Daniel Pearl. Sheikh, who had been imprisoned in connection with the 1994 Kidnappings of Western tourists in India, went on to murder Daniel Pearl and also allegedly played a significant role in planning the September 11 attacks in the United States.
Mushtaq Ahmed Zargar – who has played an active role since release in training Islamic militants in Pakistan administrated Jammu & Kashmir.
On December 30, Research and Analysis Wing Chief A.S. Dulat communicated with Jammu and Kashmir Chief Minister Farooq Abdullah, to convince him to release two prisoners as demanded by the hijacker. These prisoners were currently being held in Kashmiri jails. Abdullah was opposed to releasing the prisoners, warning Dulat of the long-term consequences, but eventually agreed to the demands of the Indian government. Mushtaq Ahmad Zargar was released from a Srinagar prison and flown with Sheikh and Azhar to Kandahar.

By this time, the hostages had been allowed to deboard the plane by the hijackers, and the hijackers had also surrendered their weapons. Passenger accounts indicated that the hijackers asked the passengers to show their gratitude to the Afghanistan government, following which money was collected and handed to one of the passengers, Anuj Sharma, who was instructed to use it to commission a memento of the hijacking for a museum in Kandahar.

However, instead of arresting the hijackers and the three prisoners who had been handed over to them, Taliban authorities drove them to the Afghanistan-Pakistan border, to Quetta in Pakistan.

Meanwhile, the Taliban had given the hijackers ten hours to leave Afghanistan. The five hijackers departed with a Taliban hostage to ensure their safe passage and were reported to have left Afghanistan.

Aftermath
Returned to Indian Airlines in January 2000, the nearly 20-year-old Airbus aircraft was "retired" from flying (pulled out of flying operations) in early 2001, and remained at the Indian Airlines engineering base in Santa Cruz, Mumbai. Bought by Airbus in May 2002, the aircraft was then stored at Chhatrapati Shivaji Maharaj International Airport in March 2003. Three and a half years after the hijacking, the hijacked aircraft was later sold as scrap by Indian Airlines in May 2003, subsequently being broken up and scrapped in Mumbai in December 2003. The hull is believed to have fetched 22 lakh. The scrapping was handled via Metal Scrap Trading Corporation (MSTC).

Trial 
The case was investigated by Central Bureau of Investigation (CBI), which charged 10 people (out of whom seven, including the five hijackers, were still absconding and are in Pakistan).  On February 5, 2008, a special anti-hijacking Patiala House Court sentenced all three accused, namely Abdul Latif, Yusuf Nepali, and Dilip Kumar Bhujel, to life imprisonment. They were charged with helping the hijackers in procuring fake passports and taking weapons on board. However, CBI moved Punjab and Haryana High Court demanding the death penalty (instead of life imprisonment) for Abdul Latif. The case came up for regular hearing in high court in September 2012, but the CBI's application was rejected. Also, Abdul Latif's application for parole was rejected in 2015. On 13 September 2012, the Jammu and Kashmir Police arrested terror suspect Mehrajuddin Dand, who allegedly provided logistical support for the hijacking of IC-814 in 1999. He allegedly provided travel papers to the hijackers. The Punjab and Haryana High Court ultimately convicted two persons for the attack, sentencing them to life imprisonment. They appealed against this sentence to the Supreme Court of India.

On 10 July 2020, one of the accused, Abdul Latif Adam Momin, along with 18 other persons including an employee of the passport office, was acquitted by a Sessions Court in Mumbai of charges relating to the fabrication of passports in connection with the hijacking incident.

The ill-fated hijacked aircraft became the largest piece of evidence involved in the subsequent criminal investigation from the Punjab courts, where the hijack case was being heard, who deemed that the aircraft was vital for investigation. The detectives got fingerprints of the hijackers from it. A model of the plane, complete with seat numbers, was created to be produced in court and a court official was trained to assemble it, as it was unwieldy.

Political aftermath 
The incident is seen as a failure of the BJP government under Prime Minister Atal Bihari Vajpayee and IB chief Ajit Doval said that India would have had a stronger negotiating hand if the aircraft had not been allowed to leave Indian territory. Doval, the IB chief, who led the four-member negotiating team to Kandahar, described the whole incident as a, "diplomatic failure," of the government in their inability to make the US and the UAE use their influence to help secure a quick release of the passengers.

External Affairs Minister Jaswant Singh also received criticism for praising the Taliban for their co-operation after the hostages had been returned.

Relatives of the passengers aboard Flight IC 814 also raised public protests at being denied information about the passengers' health and status, twice entering briefings and meetings of government officials by force, to demand information, and holding press conferences to criticize the government. A message from Kandahar ATC was circulated to the public, stating that the plane was being regularly cleaned, and that the passengers were being provided with food, water, and entertainment; this was later proven to be false, according to passenger accounts.

Support to Northern Alliance and US invasion of Afghanistan 
India had started to conduct supply operations to Panjshir in Afghanistan. Arms, ammunition and aircraft were provided to the Northern Alliance. India also provided logistical support to Ahmad Shah Massoud. The leader of the Alliance had visited India on multiple occasions to fine-tune strategies to take on the Taliban. During the US invasion of Afghanistan, Indian government allowed its military facilities to be used for strikes against Afghanistan and provided intelligence information on training camps of Islamic militants in Afghanistan.

In popular culture 
Captain Devi Sharan (Commander of IC814) recounted the events in a book titled Flight into Fear – A Captain's Story (2000). The book was written in collaboration with journalist Srinjoy Chowdhury. Flight engineer Anil K. Jaggia also wrote a book specifically depicting the events that unfolded during the hijacking ordeal titled IC 814 Hijacked! The Inside Story. The book was written in collaboration with Saurabh Shukla. The flight purser, Anil Sharma, has also written a detailed report of the hijack based on his experience in his book, IA's Terror Trail. Indian Airlines, India's sole domestic airline up to 1993, was hijacked 16 times, from 1971 to 1999.

The 2003 Bollywood film Zameen is loosely based upon the IC 814 hijacking and also Operation Entebbe of the Israel Defense Forces in Uganda. Hijack is a 2008 Indian Hindi-language action thriller film by Kunal Shivdasani based on the hijacking and stars Shiney Ahuja, Esha Deol and Ishitha Chauhan in the lead roles. Kandahar, a 2010 Indian Malayalam-language war film by Major Ravi is based on the hijacking. The political situation is portrayed from an Indian perspective in the film. Payanam, a 2011 Indian action thriller film by Radha Mohan is also loosely based on Indian Airlines hijacking but takes place at the Tirupati Airport in Andhra Pradesh.

See also 

 Amjad Farooqi, suspected hijacker
 List of hijackings of Indian aeroplanes
 List of aircraft hijackings#1990s
 List of accidents and incidents involving airliners by location#India
 List of accidents and incidents involving airliners by airline (D–O)#I
 List of accidents and incidents involving commercial aircraft#1999
 1971 Indian Airlines hijacking
 1973 Nepal plane hijack
2015 Kandahar Airport attack
Air France Flight 8969
Avianca Flight 9463
Air India Flight 182
Dawson's Field hijackings
Operation Entebbe

Further reading

Notes

References

External links

Photographs of the hijackers
My experiences aboard IC-814 (Archive)
Indian Airlines Capt. Devi Sharan was awarded the 1999 Safe Skies Award (Archive)
Aziz hand seen in Kandahar hijacking (Archive)
IC-814 hijackers free birds in Pak 
IC-814 Captain becomes a celebrity in India (Archive)

Aviation accidents and incidents in 1999
Aviation accidents and incidents in Nepal
Aircraft hijackings in India
Aviation accidents and incidents in India
Islamic terrorism in India
Terrorist incidents in India in 1999
Hostage taking
814
1999 in India
Accidents and incidents involving the Airbus A300
Vajpayee administration
Aircraft hijackings
Terrorist incidents in the United Arab Emirates
December 1999 events in Asia
Islamic terrorist incidents in 1999
2000 millennium attack plots
Aircraft hijackings in Pakistan
1999 murders in India
1999 disasters in Nepal